The Marine Stakes is a Thoroughbred horse race run annually at Woodbine Racetrack in Toronto, Ontario, Canada. Held in mid May, it is open to three-year-old horses and is contested over a distance of  miles (8.5 furlongs) on Polytrack synthetic dirt. It currently offers a purse of $150,000.

Inaugurated in 1956 at Greenwood Raceway, for Canadian-bred horses the Marine Stakes is the final prep for the Queen's Plate, Canada's most prestigious horse race. Since inception, it has been raced at various distances:
 7 furlongs : 1968-1975 at Woodbine Racetrack
  miles : 1956, 1961–1962, 1965-1966  at Greenwood Raceway, 1967, 1976 to present at Woodbine Racetrack
  miles 1957, 1963 at Greenwood Raceway
 1 mile 1958-1960 at Greenwood Raceway
  miles : 1964 at Greenwood Raceway

Records
Speed  record: (at current distance of  miles)
 1:41.80 - Victor Cooley (1996)

Most wins by an owner:
 6 - Sam-Son Farm (1974, 1985, 1987, 1988, 1990, 2013)

Most wins by a jockey:
 5 - Sandy Hawley  (1972, 1978, 1988, 1990, 1994)
 4 - Rafael Manuel Hernandez (2015, 2020, 2021, 2022) 

Most wins by a trainer:
 4 - Arthur H. Warner (1958, 1959, 1968, 1974)
 4 - Lou Cavalaris, Jr. (1965, 1967, 1970, 1972)
 4 - James E. Day (1985, 1987, 1988, 1990)
 4 - Roger Attfield (1989, 1991, 1992, 1993)

Winners of the Marine Stakes

 1964 Jammed Lively finished first but was disqualified and set back to third.
 In 1985 there was a dead heat for first.

See also
 List of Canadian flat horse races

References
 The Marine Stakes at Pedigree Query

Graded stakes races in Canada
Flat horse races for three-year-olds
Recurring sporting events established in 1956
Woodbine Racetrack
1956 establishments in Ontario